Jaya Bhattacharya is an Indian television actress. She is known for playing antagonistic roles in TV serials. She has also done small roles in movies. Best known for playing  Payal in soap opera Kyunki Saas Bhi Kabhi Bahu Thi, she also played the roles of Jigyasa Bali in Kasamh Se, Sakku Bai in Jhansi Ki Rani, and Sudha Buaa in Gangaa. She again gained popularity with her role of Vasundhara Pandey in drama series Thapki Pyar Ki (2015–2017). She appeared in Silsila Badalte Rishton Ka (2018–2019) and then she played the role of veena devi in Thapki Pyar Ki 2

Acting career
She played minor roles in Bollywood films Devdas and Lajja. She also appeared on television with shows like Kyunki Saas Bhi Kabhi Bahu Thi, playing Payal, and Banoo Main Teri Dulhan. Bhattacharya was given a cameo appearance in the 2000s Hindi film Fiza, starring Karisma Kapoor. She has also worked in the film Jigyaasa where she played a filmmaker who wants to make a documentary on a controversial actress. This character was similar to the Alice Patten's role in the Indian movie Rang De Basanti. She has also acted in Kasamh Se as Jigyasa in 2007, in the same role.

Bhattacharya was seen in the avatar of Sakku Bai in historical series Jhansi Ki Rani on Zee TV. She joined the romantic soap opera Thapki Pyar Ki in the prominent supporting character of Vasundhara Pandey; the show aired between 2015–2017. In 2018, she entered the hit show Badho Bahu as a social worker Sushma Bua.

Filmography
 Sirf Tum as Jency
Fiza – cameo appearance
 Kyo Kii... Main Jhuth Nahin Bolta as Kavita Mhatre
 Devdas as Manorama (Paro's friend)
 Lajja as Lata 
 Ho Sakta Hai as Snehal
Jigyaasa as Neha Sharma 
 Ek Vivaah Aisa Bhi
Kalpvriksh as Gurpreet
Antardwand as Bhabhi
Mimi as Dr. Asha Desai

Television

 Saraab - on DD National
 Pal Chhin (1999) - Anjali
 Amber Dhara - Kamini Mehra
 Banoo Main Teri Dulhann - Gayatri Bhua
 Kahaani Hamaaray Mahaabhaarat Ki - Kunti
 Kaisa Ye Pyar Hai - Damini Bose
 Karam Apnaa Apnaa - Shyla
Kasamh Se as Jigyasa Bali
 Kesar - Reema
 Kkaanch
 Koshish - Ek Aashaa - Suniti
 Jai Hanuman - Goddess Laxmi
 Hatim as Zalima
 Kyunki Saas Bhi Kabhi Bahu Thi - Payal Parikh/Payal Pratap Mehra (Mihir's ex-fiancée/Vishal & Urvashi's mother) 
 Raaz Ki Ek Baat
Smriti
Jai Maa Durga (TV Series) - Devi Kalika, Devi Chamunda, Devi Chandika
 Thodi Si Zameen Thoda Sa Aasmaan - Pooja
 Virasaat
 Woh Rehne Waali Mehlon Ki - Savitri
 Jhansi Ki Rani (TV series) - Sakku Bai
 Aise Karo Na Vidaa
 Ramleela – Ajay Devgn Ke Saath - Mandodhari
 Ek Thhi Naayka - Chavi Mehtha
 Upanishad Ganga - Ratnavali, Jabala
 Devon Ke Dev...Mahadev - Diti
 Madhubala – Ek Ishq Ek Junoon
 Bharat Ka Veer Putra – Maharana Pratap - Mahamanga (2014)
 Gangaa - Sudha (2015–2017)
 Thapki Pyar Ki - Vasundhara 'Vasu' Balvinder Pandey (Dhruv and Kiran's mother/Bihaan's adoptive mother/Balvinder's wife) (2015–2017)
 Saab Ji (DD National, 2016)
Badho Bahu as Sushma
Silsila Badalte Rishton Ka as Radhika Malhotra (2018–2019)
Delhi Crime
Pinjra Khoobsurti Ka as Manjari Shukla (2020–2021)
 Thapki Pyar Ki 2 as Veena Vinod Singhania (2021–2022)
 Palkon Ki Chhaon Mein 2 as Manorama Jha (2022–present)

References

External links

 
 

Living people
21st-century Indian actresses
Indian film actresses
Indian television actresses
Actresses in Hindi television
Bengali Hindus
Actresses from Lucknow
Actresses in Assamese cinema
Actresses from Mumbai
1978 births